Marasmius sacchari is a fungal plant pathogen which has been identified as causing root rot of sugar cane.

See also
List of Marasmius species

References

Fungal plant pathogens and diseases
Sugarcane diseases
sacchari